WSSM  may refer to:

 WSSM (FM), a radio station (104.9 FM) licensed to serve Prentiss, Mississippi, United States
 WYXX, a radio station (97.7 FM) licensed to serve Goshen, Indiana, United States, which held the call sign WSSM from 2011 to 2013 and from 2014 to 2016
 WHAR, a radio station licensed to serve Havelock, North Carolina, United States, known as WSSM from 2005 to 2008
 Winchester Super Short Magnum, cartridge family